Jacek Lipiński (born 26 February 1966) is a Polish lawyer, prosecutor, and mayor of Aleksandrów Łódzki, Poland city and commune since 2002. He was elected for the second term in general elections held on 18 November 2006, gaining 60.75% of the votes.

References

Living people
1966 births
Mayors of places in Poland
Civic Platform politicians
Politicians from Łódź
Polish prosecutors
University of Łódź alumni